Mount Dowling is a small mountain overlooking the south coast of Thurston Island, about 13 nautical miles (24 km) east of Von der Wall Point. It was mapped by the United States Geological Survey from surveys and U.S. Navy air photos, 1960–66, and was named by the Advisory Committee on Antarctic Names for Forrest L. Dowling, a geophysicist at Byrd Station, 1960–61.

See also
 Mountains in Antarctica

Maps
 Thurston Island – Jones Mountains. 1:500000 Antarctica Sketch Map. US Geological Survey, 1967.
 Antarctic Digital Database (ADD). Scale 1:250000 topographic map of Antarctica. Scientific Committee on Antarctic Research (SCAR). Since 1993, regularly upgraded and updated.

References 

Mountains of Ellsworth Land